Events in the year 2021 in El Salvador.

Incumbents
 President: Nayib Bukele
 Vice President: Félix Ulloa

Events
Ongoing — COVID-19 pandemic in El Salvador
14 January – Acting United States Attorney General Jeffrey Rosen announces terrorism charges against fourteen MS-13 leaders imprisoned in El Salvador.
18 January – Authorities said that money sent home by migrants reached a high of USD$5.92 billion in 2020, 4.8% higher than in 2019. Such payments make up 23% of GDP, benefitting 360,000 households.
31 January
Doctors Without Borders (MSF) suspends operations after an ambulance is attacked by an armed group in Reparto Las Canas east of San Salvador.
Two people are killed, five are injured, and five are arrested when former members of the FMLN are attacked by security forces in San Salvador.
6 February – Robert Stryk and the Sonoran Policy Group continued working as a lobbyist in Washington for the Bukele government after the Bukele claimed he had annulled a $450,000 contract.
10 February – The opposition walks back a proposal to remove President Bukele from office weeks before the election.
 28 February – 2021 Salvadoran legislative election: Preliminary results show Nayib Bukele ahead by a large margin.
 8 March – 5,000 women march in San Salvador demanding decriminalization of abortion and an end to violence against women on International Women's Day.
29 March – President Nayib Bukele demands justice for Victoria Salazar, a Salvadoran immigrant murdered by police in Tulum, Quintana Roo, Mexico.
8 June – El Salvador becomes the first country in the world to adopt the Bitcoin as official currency. "The #BitcoinLaw has just been approved by a qualified majority" in the legislative assembly, President Nayib Bukele tweeted. "History!" The law took effect on 7 September.

Scheduled events

Holidays

28 March–3 April — Holy Week
10 May – Mother's Day
17 June – Father's Day
4–6 August — August Festivals, including Feast of San Salvador
15 September – Independence Day, 200th anniversary of the Act of Independence of Central America.
2 November – Day of the Dead

Sports
29 May to 6 June – Scheduled date for the 2021 ISA World Surfing Games to take place in El Salvador.
 5 to 19 December – Scheduled date for the 2021 Central American Games, to be hosted in Santa Tecla, El Salvador.
TBA – 2020–21 Primera División de El Salvador

Deaths
January 24 – Roberto Cañas López, 70, politician, guerrilla and academic, signant of Chapultepec Peace Accords.
February 4 – Antonio Azúcar Hernández, 44, diplomat, consul in Tapachula, Chiapas, Mexico; COVID-19.
March 19 – Katherine Díaz Hernández, 22, surfer; lightning strike.
March 26 – Daniel Luna, 24, footballer (Luis Ángel Firpo), drowned.
April 9 – Edwin E. Aguilar, 46, Salvadoran-born American animator (The Simpsons, Transformers, G.I. Joe); stroke.

References

External links

 

 
2020s in El Salvador
Years of the 21st century in El Salvador
El Salvador
El Salvador